Gary M. Odegaard (born February 28, 1940) is an American former politician in the state of Washington. He served the 20th district from 1969 to 1980.

References

1940 births
Living people
Democratic Party Washington (state) state senators